MSIL can mean:
 Microsoft Intermediate Language, a programming language that has been standardized later as the Common Intermediate Language
 Multi Service Interconnect Link, a type of interconnect in BT Wholesale's service architecture
 Maruti Suzuki India Limited